Eduard Vilde ( – 26 December 1933) was an Estonian writer, a pioneer of critical realism in Estonian literature, and a diplomat. Author of classics such as The War in Mahtra and The Milkman from Mäeküla. He was one of the most revered figures in Estonian literature and is generally credited as being the country's first professional writer.

Life and career
Vilde grew on the farm where his father worked. In 1883 he began working as a journalist. He spent a great deal of his life traveling abroad and he lived for some time in Berlin in the 1890s, where he was influenced by materialism and socialism. His writings were also guided by the realism and naturalism of the French writer Émile Zola (1840–1902).  In addition to being a prolific writer, he was also an outspoken critic of Tsarist rule and of the German landowners. With the founding of the first Estonian republic in 1919, he served as an ambassador in Berlin for several years, and spent the last years of his life editing and revising an enormous volume of his collected works. After his death in 1933, he became the first person to be interred at Metsakalmistu, in the Pirita district of Tallinn.

Works

Gallery

References

External links

1865 births
1933 deaths
People from Väike-Maarja Parish
People from Kreis Wierland
Estonian Social Democratic Workers' Party politicians
Members of the Estonian Constituent Assembly
Ambassadors of Estonia to Germany
Estonian non-fiction writers
Estonian male novelists
Male non-fiction writers
19th-century Estonian novelists
20th-century Estonian novelists
19th-century male writers
20th-century male writers
Recipients of the Military Order of the Cross of the Eagle
Burials at Metsakalmistu